Cheondeungsan is a mountain between the cities of Chungju and Jecheon, in Chungcheongbuk-do, South Korea.

See also
List of mountains in Korea

Notes

References

Mountains of South Korea
Jecheon
Chungju
Mountains of North Chungcheong Province